Grassy Mountain is a summit in Murray County, Georgia. It is the second tallest peak in Murray County, if using a 100 feet (30 m) prominence rule, behind nearby Bald Mountain.

Geography
 
Grassy Mountain is located in the Chattahoochee-Oconee National Forest near Lake Conasauga. There is a fire lookout tower at the top of the mountain that offers views of Fort Mountain, the Cohutta Wilderness and the Ridge-and-Valley Appalachians.

See also
List of mountains in Georgia (U.S. state)

References

Mountains of Georgia (U.S. state)
Landforms of Murray County, Georgia
Chattahoochee-Oconee National Forest